Sir Jack Arnold Hayward  (14 June 1923 – 13 January 2015) was an English businessman, property developer, philanthropist, and president of English football club Wolverhampton Wanderers.

Biography

Early life

The only son of Charles William Hayward, an industrialist, Hayward was born in the Whitmore Reans area of Wolverhampton  and educated at Northaw Preparatory School and later Stowe School in Buckinghamshire.

At the outbreak of the Second World War, he cycled to Oxford to volunteer to fight, eventually joining the Royal Air Force (RAF), and going on to receive flight training in Yorkshire and Clewiston, Florida. He served first as a pilot officer in 671 Squadron operating under South East Asia Command (SEAC) in India, flying Dakota transporter aircraft for the supply of the 14th Army in Burma, and in 1946 was demobilised as a flight lieutenant.

Career
After demobilisation he began work in Rotary Hoes, part of the Firth Cleveland group of companies formed by his father, Sir Charles Hayward, as an agricultural equipment salesman in South Africa. In 1951 he founded the American arm of the group in New York, where he was based for five years before relocating to the Bahamas as it was a sterling area. His father began the family involvement with the Bahamas during the 1950s, after relocating his business from the United States. Jack arrived in Grand Bahama in 1956 and became a vice-president of the Grand Bahama Port Authority, which helped promote the development of Freeport. Jack took over his father's interests in the Bahamas and continued to play an active role in Freeport.

In addition to his home in Freeport, in England he owned a farm in Sussex and in Scotland was Laird of Dunmaglass, a 14,000-acre estate near Inverness. The Sunday Times Rich List placed him as 125th richest in Britain with an estimated £160 million fortune in 2009.

Wolverhampton Wanderers F.C.
Hayward twice could have become the owner of his boyhood football club Wolverhampton Wanderers, whom he had first watched aged 5. In 1982, when Wolves were in financial difficulties, he was reportedly offered 400 shares for around £40,000 but declined to buy them.  When Wolves went into receivership later that year, Hayward was reportedly behind one of the consortia interested in buying the club, but it was ultimately bought by the Bhatti brothers in an unsuccessful rescue attempt fronted by former Wolves player Derek Dougan.

Hayward became the owner and chairman of Wolves after buying the club in May 1990 for £2.11 million. It is estimated that he spent well in excess of £70m of his personal finance on redeveloping their Molineux Stadium, writing off annual debts, and purchasing players for the club during the 17 years in which he was the owner. His reign saw seven different managers employ his resources in attempts to make the club a top-flight side. In the event, they only managed one season at the highest level (2003–04), despite his riches having enabled Wolves to invest in many players who would normally have been beyond the financial reach of non-Premier League clubs. In May 2007 it was announced that he had sold control of the club to businessman Steve Morgan for a nominal £10 fee, in exchange for a conditional £30m of investment in the club. Hayward had originally offered the club for sale in September 2003, but had struggled to find suitable takers. Morgan's takeover was formally completed on 9 August 2007. Hayward remained the life president of Wolverhampton Wanderers and was later inducted into the club's Hall of Fame.

By the time he retired as chairman at Molineux, Hayward was recognised as one of a select group of football benefactors who had spent huge fortunes of time and money on rescuing their hometown boyhood club from obscurity. Other such benefactors include Jack Walker (Blackburn Rovers), Lionel Pickering (Derby County), Steve Gibson (Middlesbrough) and Dave Whelan (Wigan Athletic).

Charity
Hayward was knighted in 1986 – adding to his 1968 OBE award – for his charitable actions, having donated money in 1969 to buy Lundy Island for the National Trust, to buy the SS Great Britain and, more recently, £500,000 to the Vulcan to the Sky fund. He also put funds into repairing the King Edward VII Memorial Hospital on the Falkland Islands after the Falklands War and was named as the mystery benefactor of £1 million to the South Atlantic Fund to aid families of British serviceman killed or injured in that war.

He funded three international racing yachts, Great Britain I, II and III, spent £100,000 on saving the sloop Gannet (the Royal Navy's only survivor of the transition from sail to steam) and contributed another £100,000 to help raise the Mary Rose. After befriending fellow Wulfrunian and cricketer Rachael Heyhoe Flint, he financed tours of the West Indies by the England women's cricket team in 1969–70 and 1970–71, and in 1973 sponsored the first-ever women's cricket World Cup, two years before the first World Cup in the men's game.

Hayward appeared in the 1970 BBC Chronicle programme; "The Great Iron Ship" which documented the recovery and subsequent voyage of the SS Great Britain from the Falklands to Bristol.

Political associations
Hayward was a donor to the Liberal Party in the 1970s, having met its leader, Jeremy Thorpe, one of the West Country MPs who campaigned to get Lundy Island purchased for the nation, in 1969. He backed the party in the October 1974 General Election campaign, enabling Thorpe to travel round the coast by hovercraft on speaking tours and the party to field a record number of parliamentary candidates, although only 13 were returned as MPs. Thorpe and his wife Marion were guests at Hayward's Bahamas home and Thorpe offered – unsuccessfully – to find a buyer for Freeport in return for payment when Hayward and his colleagues were considering selling. In 1979, Hayward gave evidence for the Crown in court when Thorpe was implicated in the Norman Scott case, letters from Thorpe that Hayward had kept being among exhibits.

Hayward was awarded £50,000 in libel damages against the Sunday Telegraph after an article published in 1978 accused him of being the paymaster in the alleged conspiracy to murder Scott, of which Thorpe was cleared. In 2013, Hayward boasted that he would have founded a party "far more right-wing than Margaret Thatcher".

Style
Hayward was nicknamed "Union Jack" in the Bahamas media for his British patriotism. He imported 10 red London buses to Freeport and was permitted by the General Post Office to install British-style red telephone and pillar boxes.  Visiting seamen from the Royal Navy were always given dinner at a local restaurant “with the compliments of Sir Jack”. Back in Britain, Hayward drove a Range Rover bearing the bumper sticker: “Buy abroad — sack a Brit”. In Who's Who, he declared his recreations as, mainly, "promoting British endeavours, mainly in sport...protecting the British landscape, keeping all things bright, beautiful and British".

With his crumpled clothes and pockets stuffed with bits of paper, it was observed of Hayward that he looked “more like an absent-minded retired geography teacher than one of the richest men in the world”. He relaxed by watching cricket — he was a life member of Surrey County Cricket Club — and taking part in amateur dramatics — he built a modern theatre at Freeport for the local Players’ Guild, of which he was a leading actor. He banned non-British vehicles from his estate in Sussex and refused to drink French wine or mineral water.

Family
Hayward married Jean Mary Forder in 1948 and had two sons, Rick and Jonathan, and a daughter Susan. Susan had three children; Emma, AJ and Nicolas. Both her sons have also been involved with Wolverhampton Wanderers. Jonathan joined the board upon his father's takeover in 1990 and later served as chairman, before resigning in 1997. In 1999 his father controversially sued him for £237,000, claiming he was responsible for financial irregularities. The matter was settled out of court in favour of the elder Hayward. His elder son Rick later became chairman of the club in 2003 during the Premier League, taking over from his father, but stepped down in 2006. His grandson Rupert joined the board in the reshuffle following Steve Morgan's takeover but resigned a year later.

Hayward was awarded the freedom of the City of Wolverhampton on 9 July 2003.

In January 2011 Hayward was in a court battle for over £100 million of his own personal fortune, after being sued by his daughter Susan Heath, then aged 62, elder son Rick, 59, and six of his grandchildren after they had been removed as beneficiaries from trusts set up by him. The fallout between Hayward and his family started over the £10 sale of Wolverhampton Wanderers F.C. to Steve Morgan. 

Hayward died on 13 January 2015 in Fort Lauderdale, Florida, aged 91.

Legacy

The Sir Jack Hayward High School in Freeport, Bahamas, was named after him in 1998. Wolverhampton Wanderers' training complex at Compton is also named after him, as is Jack Hayward Way, a street beside the Molineux ground, previously Molineux Way, that was renamed in commemoration of his 80th birthday in 2003.

The Grand Bahama Highway Bridge is to be renamed the Sir Jack Hayward Bridge. Hayward had campaigned for its building for 10 years before it was launched with a contract signing ceremony in May 2014 at which he was present. The bridge was commissioned in March 2016.

The South Bank of Molineux, known as the Jack Harris Stand at the time, was renamed the Sir Jack Hayward Stand after his death.

See also
List of residents of Wolverhampton
Dunmaglass Shooting Estate

References

1923 births
2015 deaths
British chief executives
British expatriates in the United States
Royal Air Force pilots of World War II
Businesspeople awarded knighthoods
English football chairmen and investors
English investors
Knights Bachelor
Officers of the Order of the British Empire
People educated at Stowe School
People from Wolverhampton
Royal Air Force officers
Wolverhampton Wanderers F.C. directors and chairmen
20th-century British philanthropists
20th-century English businesspeople
Military personnel from Staffordshire
Chairmen and investors of football clubs in England